Beaufortia cyrtodonta, commonly known as Stirling Range bottlebrush, is a plant in the myrtle family, Myrtaceae and is endemic to the southwest of Western Australia. It is a compact shrub with crowded leaves which appear greyish due to their covering of fine, soft hairs. It has heads of red flowers in spring and occurs in the Stirling Range district.

Description
The leaves are linear, crowded and arranged in alternate pairs (decussate) so that they make four rows along the stems.

The flowers have 5 sepals, 5 petals and 5 bundles of stamens.

Taxonomy and naming
Melaleuca cyrtodonta was first formally described in 1867 by Nikolai Turczaninow in Bulletin de la Société Impériale des Naturalistes de Moscou. In 1867, George Bentham transferred it to Beaufortia as Beaufortia cyrtodonta. The specific epithet ("cyrtodonta") is from the Ancient Greek  meaning "curved" or "bent" and  meaning "tooth".

Distribution and habitat
Beaufortia cyrtodonta mainly occurs in the Stirling Range district in the Avon Wheatbelt, Esperance Plains, Jarrah Forest and Mallee bioregions of south-western Western Australia. It grows in sandy and gravelly soils often derived from laterite on hills and outcrops.

Conservation
Beaufortia cyrtodonta is classified as "not threatened" by the Western Australian Government Department of Biodiversity, Conservation and Attractions.

References

cyrtodonta
Plants described in 1867
Endemic flora of Western Australia
Taxa named by Nikolai Turczaninow